A. K. Chanda Law College better known as AKCLC is a law school situated at Tarapur, Silchar, in Cachar district in the Indian state of Assam. It offers 3 years LL.B. course affiliated to Assam University. This college is recognised by Bar Council of India (BCI), New Delhi.

History
A. K. Chanda Law college was established in 1960 in memoirs of freedom fighter and social worker Arun Kumar Chanda.

See also 
 Assam University

References

Law schools in Assam
Educational institutions established in 1960
1960 establishments in Assam
Universities and colleges in Assam
Colleges affiliated to Assam University